John Mitchel's Hurling and Camogie Club is a Gaelic Athletic Association club based in Birmingham, England, and is the oldest club in the Warwickshire GAA. It has been long one of the leading Warwickshire clubs in hurling, competing in the county Senior Championship, and in camogie, competing at Junior level. There is an associated Gaelic football club. The club is named after John Mitchel, the 19th-century Irish revolutionary.

History

Early 20th century
John Mitchel's Hurling Club was formed in 1933, around the same time as the Warwickshire County Board. In fact, the club supplied pitches and playing kit to the county, which is how the Warwickshire hurlers came to have a white strip.

In the early years the club, Paddy Ryan from Pallasgreen, County Limerick and Mick Ryan from County Laois were at the helm. In the 1940s, the club was dominant in all competitions. Then in the 1960s, John Mitchel's built what was arguably their best-ever team - they reached their peak in 1971 winning the Warwickshire championship and getting through to the Championship of Britain final. Here they faced the Brian Boru club in New Eltham, with Mitchel's winning what was a "highly competitive match".

Club reformed in 1990s
Some years later, the John Mitchel's hurling club folded due to lack of players. But in 1990, the club was reformed, and by 1991 they had regained the Warwickshire Senior Hurling crown. Soon afterwards an underage section was set up in the club. In 2004, the club beat London GAA champions Brothers Pearse to win the club championship of Britain in Ruislip. More than 30 years after that victory in New Eltham, the club had again claimed a British championship and this time went on to the All Ireland club quarter final losing out by a point.

One hurler with the team in their glory days was Billy Collins from Limerick, who remained involved in the club and Warwickshire hurling until his death in 2008. He served as chairman of the County Board for over 25 years. He also helped develop and maintain Páirc na hÉireann, in Solihull, the county's ground. Collins' son, Michael, has also been involved with the club and county and was involved in the management of the county team in the Nicky Rackard Cup and Leinster league.

John Mitchel's regained the club championship of Britain in 2007, once again against Brothers Pearse in Ruislip, after a drawn game in Páirc na hÉireann. They retained the crown in Páirc na hÉireann in November 2008 to become the first holders of the Billy Collins Cup, which was donated by the Provincial Council of Britain.

Notable players
 Jack Grealish, later a professional association football player who captained Aston Villa and played for the England national team, played Gaelic football for the club

References

External links
 http://www.johnmitchelsbirmingham.gaa.ie

Gaelic football clubs in Britain
Hurling clubs in Britain
Sport in Birmingham, West Midlands